Graham Pace, nicknamed "Eddie", is an American former Negro league outfielder who played in the 1930s.

Pace played for the Nashville Elite Giants in 1930. In eight recorded games, he posted five hits in 31 plate appearances.

References

External links
 and Seamheads

Year of birth missing
Place of birth missing
Nashville Elite Giants players
Baseball outfielders